Walter Holmes (9 May 1892–1978) was an English footballer who played in the Football League for Darlington and Middlesbrough.

References

1892 births
1978 deaths
English footballers
Association football defenders
English Football League players
Willington A.F.C. players
Middlesbrough F.C. players
Darlington F.C. players